Overland Custom Coach, Inc is a London, Ontario-based builder of customized vehicles and buses.

Established in 1981, it is a supplier of tour, shuttle & wheelchair-accessible low floor and lift-equipped buses to the Canadian market with sales to the US market for ELF products.

Overland also has manufacturing facilities in Brown City, Michigan.

Clients
Markham Transit - 1 ELF125 - transferred to YRT
York Region Transit - 17 ELF125 (1 acquired from Markham)
Toronto Transit Commission for Wheel-Trans - ELF122 and will be retired at end of 2016
Baycrest Hospital - Toronto, Ontario - ELF125
Halifax Metro Transit for MetroExpress - all retired
Durham Region Transit - 1 ELF125 and 3 ELF128 acquired from Ajax-Pickering Transit

Products

Buses
ELF122 Low Floor
ELF125 Low Floor
ELF128 Low Floor
ELF Environmental Low Floor
ELF CNG Low Floor
Hybrid Electric ELF128
Glaval Universal
Glaval Primetime
Glaval Concorde
Glaval Concorde II
Glaval Titan
Glaval Titan II
Glaval Entourage
Glaval Apollo
Glaval Synergy
Glaval Easy On GLF Low Floor
Starcraft Allstar
Starcraft Starlite
Starcraft Starquest
Starcraft UltraStar
Starcraft XLT
Elkhart Coach EC II

Trucks
LF Cube Van
LF Truck

References
Home Page

Bus manufacturers of Canada
Companies based in London, Ontario
Buildings and structures in Sanilac County, Michigan